Will Kohler is a retired American soccer midfielder who was a member of the United States U-17 men's national soccer team at the 1991 FIFA U-17 World Championship.  He won the 1991 USYSA U-16 championship with F.C. Delco.  

Nowadays, Will works in Venture capital and is a partner with Lightspeed Ventures Partners.

Soccer
Kohler graduated from Lower Merion High School in Ardmore, Pennsylvania where he was a three time All State soccer player.  He was a 1991 and 1992 High School All-American.  He is a member of the Lower Merion Soccer Hall of Fame.  During high school, he also played for F.C. Delco from 1990 to 1995.  In 1995, Delco went to the 1991 U-16 USYSA National Youth Championship game where Kohler scored in Delco's 2-0 victory over Countryside F.C.  Kohler attended Harvard University, where he played on the men's soccer team from 1993 to 1996.  He graduated in 1997 with a bachelor's degree in economics.  In February 1997, the MetroStars selected Kohler in the second round (fifteenth overall) of the 1997 MLS College Draft. They released him during the pre-season.

Venture capital
Kohler helped found Pointe Communications.  He then began a career in venture capital beginning with Prospect Street Ventures.  He was a principal at Prism VentureWorks.  In February 2010, Kohler became a general partner with Summerhill Venture Partners. Since 2014, Kohler has been a partner at Lightspeed Venture Partners.

References

External links
 FIFA: Will Kohler
 Tech Stars: Will Kohler

1975 births
Living people
American soccer players
Harvard Crimson men's soccer players
United States men's youth international soccer players
Boston Bulldogs (soccer) players
A-League (1995–2004) players
New York Red Bulls draft picks
Association football midfielders
Lower Merion High School alumni